Elizabeth Julia Blatchford (born 5 February 1980) is an English professional triathlete. She has placed third at the 2013 and 2015 Ironman World Championship.

Career
Blatchford was born in Wilmslow, Cheshire and raised in Perth, Western Australia from the age of one. Growing up she participated in surf lifesaving and by the age of 14 she had started racing in triathlon. She went on to obtain a degree in marine biology from Griffith University.

Blatchford's first ITU race was at the 2000 ITU Triathlon World Championships in Perth competing as a Junior woman and placing 8th. She raced consistently on the ITU circuit from 2001 to 2012 capturing ten podium finishes in either the ITU World Triathlon Series or the ITU Triathlon World Cup series including wins at the 2003 Gamagori World Cup race and the 2005 Salford World Cup race. Despite growing up in Australia Blatchford made the decision to race for the United Kingdom in 2004. This was done based on her desire to qualify for the 2004 Olympics and that the British women at the time were not as strong as the Australian women. Additionally, her coach, Brett Sutton, was not supported by Triathlon Australia. However, in her years of ITU racing she missed qualifying for three Olympics. Missing the 2012 Olympic cut was difficult for Blatchford as a younger, inexperienced Lucy Hall was chosen over her and Jodie Stimpson so that Hall could play a domestique role.

In 2012 Blatchford began to step away from ITU racing and towards non-drafting, long-distances races, a choice based on her age in comparison to the younger ITU athletes and for the desire to have more autonomy with her race and training schedule. Her first year away from ITU she took first place at Ironman 70.3 Boulder and Ironman 70.3 Cozumel and in 2013 she had first places at Ironman 70.3 Busselton and Ironman Cairns. She capped off that year with a third place podium in her debut in Hawaii at the 2013 Ironman World Championship. She followed that performance up with a 10th place at the 2014 Ironman World Championship, where she received a four-minute littering penalty, and then another third place podium finish at the 2015 Ironman World Championship. Her other long course results include winning Ironman Cairns three years in a row from 2013 to 2015.

Results
Blatchford's results include:

References

External links

ITU Profile

1980 births
Living people
English female triathletes
Griffith University alumni
People from Wilmslow
Sportspeople from Perth, Western Australia
Triathletes at the 2006 Commonwealth Games
Commonwealth Games competitors for England
Australian female triathletes
Sportswomen from Western Australia
English emigrants to Australia
Sportspeople from Cheshire